{{Automatic taxobox
| fossil_range = 
| image = Eomorphippus bondi.jpg
| image_caption = Skull of Eomorphippus bondi
| taxon = Notohippidae
| authority = Ameghino, 1894
| subdivision_ranks = Genera
| subdivision = 
 †Acoelohyrax
 †Argyrohippus
 †Edvardocopeia
 †Eomorphippus
 †Eurygenium
 †Mendozahippus
 †Moqueguahippus
 †Morphippus
 †Nesohippus
 †Notohippus
 †Pampahippus
 †Perhippidion
 †Puelia
 †Plexotemnus
 †Purperia?
 †Rhynchippus
 †Rosendo
 †Stilhippus †Teushentherium †Trimerostephanos}}

Notohippidae is a paraphyletic extinct family of notoungulate mammals from South America. Notohippids are known from the Eocene and Oligocene epochs.

 Description 
Although the name notohippids means "southern horses," these animals did not look like horses. The name refers to the teeth very similar to those of horses, with sharp incisors and high-crowned molars suitable for shredding grass. The shape of the skull and particularly the dentition is the result of convergent evolution with the equids, perissodactyl mammals that developed on the northern continents. The body of notohippids was rather stocky, supported by relatively elongated legs equipped with claws (and not hooves). The earliest forms of notohippids possessed low-crowned molars, but in the course of evolution the teeth gradually became more prismatic, and covered with a thick layer of cement; the skull also became longer, and as a result of elongation, spaces formed between incisors, canines and molars.

 Classification 
The notohippid family was first described by Florentino Ameghino in 1894. The first notohippids developed during the Lower Eocene, Pampahippus from ancestors that are probably to be found in the archaic family of the Isotemnidae or the Oldfieldtomasiidae. Later, over the course of the Oligocene, gradually more specialized forms originated, including Notohippus, Rhynchippus Eurygenium, Eomorphippus, Morphippus, Mendozahippus, Pascualihippus, Argyrohippus. One of the last forms attributed to this family, the large Colpodon'' from the Lower Miocene, is actually a probable aberrant representative of the family Leontiniidae.

The notohippids are part of the notoungulates, a large group of South American mammals that developed, over the course of the Cenozoic, a number of forms of various appearance and size. The notohippids, in particular, are part of the toxodont group, of which they are considered among the most basal members. Recent studies indicate, however, that the notohippid family is not a monophyletic group, but rather paraphyletic and therefore invalid in a cladistic sense, since it consists of gradually more evolved forms that are increasingly close to the origin of other notoungulate groups.

References

Toxodonts
Eocene mammals
Oligocene mammals
Eocene first appearances
Burdigalian extinctions
Prehistoric mammal families

Paraphyletic groups